Kathy Kristensen Lambert (born February 24, 1953) is an American politician and educator from Washington. Lambert was a member of the King County Council for the third district, including North Bend, Snoqualmie, Issaquah, Sammamish, Fall City, Preston, Duvall, Redmond, Carnation, Skykomish, and parts of Woodinville. Lambert is a former Republican member of the Washington House of Representatives and a former elementary school teacher.

Education 
Lambert earned a Bachelor of Arts degree in Elementary and Business Education from University of Washington.

Career 
Lambert was an elementary school teacher. Lambert is also a published poet and children's book author.

On November 8, 1994, Lambert won the election and became a Republican member of Washington House of Representatives for District 45, Position 1. Lambert defeated Philip James with 70.04% of the votes. Lambert started her term on January 3, 1995. On November 5, 1996, as an incumbent, Lambert won the election and continued serving District 45, Position 1. Lambert defeated Trina Good with 61.87% of the votes. On November 3, 1998, as an incumbent, Lambert won the election unopposed and continued serving District 45, Position 1. On November 7, 2000, as an incumbent, Lambert won the election and continued serving District 45, Position 1. Lambert defeated Jim Gordon with 68.58% of the votes.

On November 6, 2001, Lambert won the election and became a member of King County Council for District 3. Lambert defeated Democrat Kristy Sullivan with 64.11% of the votes.

In 2009 and 2013 she was unopposed.

On October 6, 2021, Lambert's re-election campaign sent a mailer depicting Girmay Zahilay, the only person of color on the King County Council, as a "puppet master" controlling a marionette depicting her general election challenger, Sarah Perry. A majority of the King County Council and the King County Executive Dow Constantine denounced the mailer as racist. Supporters and donors of Lambert's campaign, including the Washington Association of Realtors and the Seattle Mariners, also condemned her mailer and withdrew their endorsements. Lambert initially defended the mailer on Facebook but later deleted her post, soon replacing it with an apology. On October 12, the King County Council unanimously voted to strip Lambert of her committee chairmanships and to reassign the vacancies caused by the position removals, saying that Lambert's actions "have adversely impacted the ability of the council to conduct its business efficiently and effectively."

In November 2021, she was defeated for reelection by Sarah Perry.

Political positions
Lambert has taken controversial stances on many issues which have drawn criticism. In the past she has voted against gun safety laws, praised the Trump administration, voted against making anti-abortion centers unable to label themselves as health care facilities, and has voted against making Juneteenth and Indigenous Peoples Day holidays.

Lambert has defended Joe Fain, who has been accused of sexual assault and she blamed the accuser for their behavior. Lambert has also proposed that landlords should be given public defenders during eviction proceedings.

Awards 
 2013 Outstanding Public Official of the Year. Presented by United Way of King County.
 2013 Norm Maleng Award. Presented by LifeWire.
 2013 International Rose Day Award. Presented by Zonta Club of East King County.

Personal life 
Lambert's husband is Daryl. Lambert and her family live in Redmond, Washington.

References

External links 
 Kathy Lambert at ballotpedia.org
 Kathy Lambert at leg.wa.gov
 Kathy Lambert at ourcampaigns.com

1953 births
King County Councillors
Women state legislators in Washington (state)
Republican Party members of the Washington House of Representatives
Living people
People from Redmond, Washington
21st-century American women